In information theory, information dimension is an information measure for random vectors in Euclidean space, based on the normalized entropy of finely quantized versions of the random vectors. This concept was first introduced by Alfréd Rényi in 1959.

Simply speaking, it is a measure of the fractal dimension of a probability distribution. It characterizes the growth rate of the Shannon entropy given by successively finer discretizations of the space.

In 2010, Wu and Verdú gave an operational characterization of Rényi information dimension as the fundamental limit of almost lossless data compression for analog sources under various regularity constraints of the encoder/decoder.

Definition and Properties 

The entropy of a discrete random variable  is

where  is the probability measure of  when , and the  denotes a set .

Let  be an arbitrary real-valued random variable. Given a positive integer , we create a new discrete random variable

Then

and

are called lower and upper information dimensions of  respectively.

Some important properties of information dimension :
 If the mild condition  is fulfilled, we have .
 It is sufficient to calculate the upper and lower information dimensions when restricting to the exponential subsequence .

d-Dimensional Entropy 

If the information dimension  exists, one can define the -dimensional entropy of this distribution by

provided the limit exists. If , the zero-dimensional entropy equals the standard Shannon entropy . For integer dimension , the -dimensional entropy is the -fold integral defining the respective differential entropy.

An equivalent definition of Information Dimension 

In 1994, Kawabata and Dembo in  proposed a new way of measuring information based on rate distortion value of a random variable. The measure is defined as

where  is the rate-distortion function that is defined as

They further, proved that such definition is equivalent to the definition of information dimension. Formally,

Dimensional-Rate Bias 

This value  that is named dimensional-rate bias is defined in a way to capture the finite term of rate-distortion function. Formally,

The dimensional-rate bias is equal to d-dimensional rate for continuous, discrete, and discrete-continuous mixed distribution. Furthermore, it is calculable for a set of singular random variables, while d-dimensional entropy does not necessarily exist there.

Finally, dimensional-rate bias generalizes the Shannon's entropy and differential entropy, as one could find the mutual information  using the following formula:

Discrete-Continuous Mixture Distributions 

Let   be a random variable such that .

Example 

Consider a signal which has a Gaussian probability distribution.

We pass the signal through a half-wave rectifier which converts all negative value to 0, and maintains all other values. The half-wave rectifier can be characterized by the function

Then, at the output of the rectifier, the signal has a rectified Gaussian distribution. It is characterized by an atomic mass of weight 0.5 and has a Gaussian PDF for all .

With this mixture distribution, we apply the formula above and get the information dimension  of the distribution and calculate the -dimensional entropy.The normalized right part of the zero-mean Gaussian distribution has entropy , hence

Connection to Differential Entropy 

It is shown  that information dimension and differential entropy are tightly connected.

Let  be a random variable with continuous density .  Suppose we divide the range of  into bins of length . By the mean value theorem, there exists a value  within each bin such that

Consider the discretized random variable  if  .

The probability of each support point  is

Let .

If we set  and  then we are doing exactly the same quantization as the definition of information dimension. Since relabeling the events of a discrete random variable does not change its entropy, we have

This yields

and when  is sufficiently large,

which is the differential entropy  of the continuous random variable. In particular, if  is Riemann integrable, then

Comparing this with the -dimensional entropy shows that the differential entropy is exactly the one-dimensional entropy

In fact, this can be generalized to higher dimensions. Rényi shows that, if  is a random vector in a -dimensional Euclidean space  with an absolutely continuous distribution with a probability density function  and finite entropy of the integer part, we have

and

if the integral exists.

Lossless data compression 

The information dimension of a distribution gives a theoretical upper bound on the compression rate, if one wants to compress a variable coming from this distribution. In the context of lossless data compression, we try to compress real number with less real number which both have infinite precision.

 encoder:  which converts information from a source into symbols for communication or storage;
 decoder:  is the reverse process, converting code symbols back into a form that the recipient understands.

Define  to be the infimum of  such that there exists a sequence of codes such that  for all sufficiently large .

So  basically gives the ratio between the code length and the source length, it shows how good a specific encoder decoder pair is. The fundamental limits in lossless source coding are as follows.

Consider a continuous encoder function  with its continuous decoder function . It means that one can build an encoder-decoder pair with infinity compression rate.

In order to get some nontrivial and meaningful conclusions, let  the minimum achievable rate for linear encoder and Borel decoder. If random variable  has a distribution which is a mixture of discrete and continuous part. Then  for all  Suppose we restrict the decoder to be a Lipschitz continuous function and   holds, then the minimum achievable rate  for all .

The fundamental role of information dimension in lossless data compression further extends beyond the i.i.d. data. It is shown that for specified processes (e.g., moving-average processes) the ratio of lossless compression is also equal to the information dimension rate rate. This result allows for further compression that was not possible by considering only marginal distribution of the process.

See also 
 Fractal dimension
 Correlation dimension
 Entropy (information theory)

Notes

References

Information theory